Nature Electronics is a monthly peer-reviewed scientific journal published by Nature Portfolio. It was established in 2018. The editor-in-chief is Owain Vaughan.

Abstracting and indexing 
The journal is abstracted and indexed in:
Science Citation Index Expanded
Scopus

According to the Journal Citation Reports, the journal has a 2021 impact factor of 33.255, ranking it 1st out of 276 journals in the category "Engineering, Electrical & Electronic".

References

External links 
 

English-language journals
electronics journals
Nature Research academic journals
Monthly journals
Online-only journals
Publications established in 2018